A fake passport is a counterfeit of a passport (or other travel document) issued by a nation or authorised agency. Such counterfeits are copies of genuine passports, or illicitly modified genuine passports made by unauthorized persons, sometimes called cobblers. Its purpose is to be used deceptively as if it were a legitimate travel or identity document. A passport obtained from an authorized issuer by providing false information may also be considered fake.

Such falsified passports can be used to leave a country from which exit is barred, for identity theft, age fabrication, illegal immigration, and organized crime.

Other comparable documents include camouflage passports, which are not copies of a valid form of document, but are designed to look like a passport issued by a body that cannot issue legitimate passports, such as "Republic of Mainau", or a "Baltic Trade Mission" diplomatic document. Fantasy passports, such as the World Passport, are passport-like documents issued by non-official organizations or micronations as a novelty or souvenir, to make a political statement, or to show loyalty to a political or other cause.

Incidents
Adolf Eichmann (high-ranking Nazi often referred to as "the architect of the Holocaust") after the end of World War II traveled to Argentina using a fraudulently obtained laissez-passer issued by the International Red Cross and lived there under a false identity.

Alexander Solonik (Russian hitman in the early 1990s) lived in Greece with a fake passport, which he had obtained from the Greek consulate in Moscow.

In October 2000, Alexander Litvinenko (Russian dissident and writer) fled to Turkey from Ukraine on a forged passport using the alias Chris Reid, as his actual passport was impounded by Russian authorities after criminal charges were filed against him.

In May 2001, Kim Jong-nam, the son of North Korean leader Kim Jong-il,  was arrested at Narita International Airport, in Tokyo, Japan, travelling on a fake Dominican Republic passport. He was detained by immigration officials and later deported to the People's Republic of China. The incident caused Kim Jong-il to cancel a planned visit to China due to the embarrassment caused by the incident.

In June 2005, American actor Wesley Snipes was detained in South Africa at Johannesburg International Airport for allegedly trying to pass through the airport with a fake South African passport. Snipes was allowed to return home because he had a valid U.S. passport.

In early 2020 the Brazilian soccer player Ronaldinho and his brother were detained in Paraguay while trying to enter the country with fake Paraguayan passports.

References

External links

Passports
International travel documents
Identity documents
Passport